Cédric Kauffmann (born 1 March 1976) is a former professional tennis player from France, most notable for an encounter with Pete Sampras in 2001.

Career
Kauffmann played collegiate tennis at the University of Kentucky, where he now is the head coach of the Men's Team. He was an All-American every year from 1996 to 1998.
 
In the 2000 US Open he qualified for the main draw and lost to countryman Arnaud Di Pasquale in the opening round.

His most memorable match came when, ranked 250th in the world, he came close to upsetting Peter Sampras 6–3, 4–6, 6–2, 3–6, 8–6 in first round of the 2001 French Open. In the fifth set he was unable to convert three match points, eventually losing 6–8. He also competed in the men's doubles at the same event, with Jean-Francois Bachelot, but again exited in the first round

He is married and has 4 kids.

Challenger titles

Singles: (1)

Doubles: (2)

References

1976 births
Living people
French male tennis players
Kentucky Wildcats men's tennis players